is a Japanese classical pianist.

Life 
Born in Nagoya, Hirose started playing the piano at the age of three. When she was 6 years old, she interpreted Mozart's Piano Concerto No. 26. At the age of 15, after having given many concerts, she moved to France. She entered the École Normale de Musique de Paris in Germaine Mounier's class and graduated unanimously. She then joined the Conservatoire national supérieur de musique et de danse (CNSM) with Bruno Rigutto and Nicholas Angelich as professors In 1997, she won first prize in the Martha Argerich competition, which marked the beginning of her solo career. In 1999, she was unanimously awarded the first prize for piano by the CNSM and the Daniel Magne prize. In 2000, she was given an honorable mention at the XIV International Chopin Piano Competition.

She then returned to Japan, gave many concerts and recorded several CDs. Since 2008, she has been living in France again and regularly returns to Japan to give recitals.

She later perfected her skills with Marie-Françoise Bucquet and Jorge Chaminé, and more recently, with Alfred Brendel.

She regularly plays at the La Folle Journée in Nantes at the beginning of each year, an event she considers a "must-attend" one.

Selected discography 

 Chaconne, 2004, Nippon Columbia
 La Valse, 2005
 Fantaisies, Denon
 Le vent, Denon
 Chopin : Ballades et Nocturnes, 2010, Mirare
 Concertos de Litz et schumann, 2011, Mirare
 Balakirev, 2012, Mirare
 Sonatas for piano, 2012, Mirare
 Des Knaben Wunderhorn, 2013, ELOQUENCE
 Russian Ballet Transcriptions, 2017, Piano21

Awards 
 1997: Premier prix au Concours Martha Argerich.
 1999: Prix Daniel Magne
 1999: Premier prix de piano à l'unanimité au Conservatoire de Paris

References

External links 
 Official website
 Etsuko Hirose (Discogs)
 Etsuko Hirose – Debussy: Estampes (YouTube)

1979 births
Living people
People from Nagoya
École Normale de Musique de Paris alumni
Conservatoire de Paris alumni
Japanese classical pianists
Women classical pianists
Japanese women pianists
21st-century pianists
21st-century Japanese women musicians
21st-century classical pianists
21st-century women pianists